Uynarey is one of the Shetland islands in Yell Sound, just to the north of Bigga, and east of Brother Island. It is an RSPB reserve. The name comes from the Norse for "venerated island", and this may reflect a Culdee connection.

Geology and geography
There is a small bay in the east - Haa Geo, and a cave in the west. The North end is called "the Niv". The geology is moine gneiss and quartzite.

See also

 List of islands of Scotland

References

Uninhabited islands of Shetland